Lički Čitluk is a village in the Gospić municipality in the Lika region of central Croatia, Lika-Senj County. It is located near Gospić, connected by the D25 highway. The 2011 census registered 4 residents.

Demographics

References

Populated places in Lika-Senj County
Serb communities in Croatia